Year 1032 (MXXXII) was a leap year starting on Saturday (link will display the full calendar) of the Julian calendar.

Events 
 By place 

 Byzantine Empire 
 Spring – Emperor Romanos III (Argyros) sends a Byzantine expeditionary army under General Michael Protospatharios, which includes Western auxiliaries and elite troops of Asia Minor, to reinforce the Byzantine position in Calabria (Southern Italy).

 Europe 
 September 6 – King Rudolph III dies without any heirs. He bequeaths his entire dominions to Emperor Conrad II (the Elder), dispatching to him the Holy Lance and ring of St. Maurice, symbols of Burgundian investiture.
 Odo II, count of Champagne, invades Burgundy and seizes most of the kingdom for himself. With the assistance of Humbert I of Savoy, Queen-dowager Ermengarde (Rudolph III's widow) flees to the safety of Zürich.
 Winter – Conrad II marches with his army into Champagne and devastes the land – forcing Odo II to sue for peace and swear to abandon Burgundy. The bishops prevent Conrad from seizing control of Burgundy.
 The first mention is made of Kursk, Russia, in the hagiography of Theodosius, who becomes a monk at the Kiev Caves Monastery (approximate date).

 By topic 

 Religion 
 October – Pope John XIX dies after an 8-year pontificate at Rome. He is succeeded by his nephew Benedict IX as the 145th pope of the Catholic Church, while (probably) still in his teens.

Births 
 February 16 – Ying Zong, Chinese emperor (d. 1067)
 September 3 – Go-Sanjō, Japanese emperor (d. 1073)
 September 14 – Dao Zong, Chinese emperor (d. 1101)
 Abe no Munetō, Japanese nobleman and samurai (d. 1108)
 Cheng Hao, Chinese neo-confucian philosopher (d. 1085)
 Donald III (the Fair), king of Scotland (approximate date)
 Ermengol III (or Armengol), count of Urgell (d. 1065)
 Gao, Chinese empress consort and regent (d. 1093)
 Gyrth Godwinson, English nobleman (approximated date)
 Hugh de Grandmesnil, Norman warrior and sheriff (d. 1098)
 Osbern FitzOsbern, bishop of Exeter (approximate date)
 Touzi Yiqing, Chinese Zen Buddhist monk (d. 1083)
 Vratislaus II (or Wratislaus), king of Bohemia (d. 1092)

Deaths 
 July 28 – Constance of Arles, French queen
 July 29 – Matilda of Swabia, German duchess
 September 6 – Rudolph III, king of Burgundy 
 October 4 – Sancho VI, duke of Gascony
 Ahmad Maymandi, Ghaznavid vizier
 Arslan Yabgu, Turkic chieftain and ruler
 Bezprym (or Besfrim), duke of Poland
 Constantine Diogenes, Byzantine general
 Gille Coemgáin, king of Moray (Scotland)
 John XIX, pope of the Catholic Church
 Li, Chinese consort and concubine (b. 987)
 Li Deming, Chinese rebel leader (b. 981)
 Odo II, margrave of the Saxon Ostmark
 Otto Orseolo (or Ottone), doge of Venice

References